New York University Division of Libraries (NYU Libraries) is the library system of New York University (NYU), located on the university's global campus, but primarily in the United States. It is one of the largest university libraries in the United States. The NYU Libraries hold nearly 10 million volumes and comprises five main libraries in Manhattan and one each in Brooklyn, Abu Dhabi and Shanghai. Its flagship, the Elmer Holmes Bobst Library on Washington Square, receives 2.6 million visits annually. Around the world the Libraries offers access to about 10 million electronic journals, books, and databases. NYU's Game Center Open Library in Brooklyn is the largest collection of games held by any university in the world.

NYU Libraries

New York University (NYU) library system is composed of the following libraries:

Elmer Holmes Bobst Library
Sid and Ruth Lapidus Health Sciences Library
Waldmann Memorial Dental Library
Grey Fine Arts Library and Study Center
Business Library
Ross Library at the Stern School of Business' Accounting Department
Jack Brause Library for Real Estate
Courant Institute of Mathematical Sciences Library 
Institute of Fine Arts Library
Ettinghausen Library 	
Dibner Library 
Constantine Georgiou Library
Crisman Library at Broome Residential College
Avery Fisher Library for Music and Media
Acton Library 
Game Center Open Library
Institute for the Study of the Ancient World (ISAW) 
Law Library 
New-York Historical Society 
New York School of Interior Design Library 
NYU Abu Dhabi Library 	
NYU Shanghai Library 	
Villa La Pietra Library

Specialized libraries
Bern Dibner Library (Tandon School of Engineering)
Business Library (Stern School of Business)
Courant Institute of Mathematical Sciences Library (Courant Institute of Mathematical Sciences)
Health Sciences Libraries (including Ehrman Medical Library)
Institute for the Study of the Ancient World Library
Jack Brause Library for Real Estate (Schack Institute of Real Estate, School for Professional Studies)
Law Library (School of Law)
Ettinghausen Library (Near Eastern Studies)
Conservation Center Library (Institute of Fine Arts)
Stephen Chan Library of Fine Arts (Institute of Fine Arts)
Ross Library (Stern School of Business' Accounting Department)
Grey Fine Arts Library and Study Center (Art History)
Avery Fisher Library (Music and Media)
Game Center Open Library (Tandon School of Engineering)
The Constantine Georgiou Library (Steinhardt School of Culture, Education, and Human Development)

See also 
 New York University
 Fales Library

References

Libraries
University and college academic libraries in the United States